Acrocercops didymella is a moth of the family Gracillariidae. It is known in Australia from the states of New South Wales, Victoria, South Australia and Western Australia.

The larvae feed on Acacia cultriformis and Acacia longifolia. They probably mine the leaves of their host plant.

References

didymella
Moths of Australia
Moths described in 1880